Abbasabad (also Romanized as ‘Abbāsābād; formerly, Veresk (Persian: وَرسَك) and Varaak) is a city & capital of Abbasabad County, in Mazandaran Province, Iran.

It is located on the Caspian Sea.

At the 2006 census, its population was 11,256, in 3,195 families.

References

Cities in Mazandaran Province

Populated coastal places in Iran
Populated places on the Caspian Sea